The 2014–15 FC Torpedo Moscow season was the club's 1st season back in the Russian Premier League, the highest tier of association football in Russia, since their relegation in 2006. Torpedo Moscow will also be taking part in the Russian Cup.

Season events
On 19 May, Torpedo Moscow players boycotted training as a result of not being paid since January.

Squad

Out on loan

Transfers

Summer

In:

Out:

Winter

In:

Out:

Competitions

Russian Premier League

Results by round

Matches

League table

Russian Cup

Squad statistics

Appearances and goals

|-
|colspan="14"|Players away from the club on loan:
|-
|colspan="14"|Players who appeared for Torpedo Moscow no longer at the club:

|}

Goal scorers

Disciplinary record

Notes
 MSK time changed from UTC+4 to UTC+3 permanently on 26 October 2014.

References

FC Torpedo Moscow seasons
Torpedo Moscow